Daniel Dean Warthen (born December 1, 1952) is an American former professional baseball player and current coach for the Texas Rangers.

Early life
Warthen was born in Omaha, Nebraska, and is Jewish. He attended Omaha North High School in Omaha, graduating in 1971, and was a high school All-American quarterback, tight end, and linebacker in football and also a star in baseball. He was the 1971 co-winner of the B'nai B'rith Award. In 2018 he was inducted into the Omaha Public Schools Athletic Hall of Fame.

Playing career
Warthen was drafted by the Montreal Expos in the 2nd round of the 1971 Major League Baseball Draft. He pitched first for the Watertown Expos in the 1971 Northern League, and was 9–3 with a 3.96 ERA, leading the league with 10 complete games and second in the league in wins.

He made his Major League Baseball debut as a 22-year-old with the Expos on May 18, 1975, pitching a scoreless eighth inning against the Cincinnati Reds. In his rookie season in 1975, Warthen was 8–6 with three saves and a 3.11 ERA in 167.2 innings over 40 games (18 starts), and was 3rd in the National League in hits per 9 IP (6.978) and 4th in strikeouts per 9 IP (6.871).

Warthen pitched four seasons in the major leagues with Montreal, Philadelphia, and Houston. He finished his major-league career with a 12–21 win–loss record and a 4.31 ERA.

Coaching career

Warthen began his coaching career with the Pittsburgh Pirates in 1981, following that with coaching in the minor league organizations of San Diego and Philadelphia. Warthen was the pitching coach for the Detroit Tigers (1999–2002), San Diego Padres (1996–97), and Seattle Mariners (1992), also serving as the Mariners bullpen coach in 1991. He was the pitching coach for the Triple A Norfolk Tides from 2003 to 2005.

Warthen served as the bullpen coach for the Los Angeles Dodgers under manager Grady Little from 2006 to 2007. On June 17, 2008, Warthen was named the New York Mets pitching coach, replacing Rick Peterson. In the 2012 off-season rumors speculated that Warthen would not return due to the staff changes, but he stayed along with then hitting coach Dave Hudgens. In 2014, Warthen used the slur "Chinaman" in a conversation with an Asian-American interpreter in the clubhouse. He later issued an apology.

Warthen was relieved of his coaching position by the Mets on October 3, 2017, but was offered another role with the organization, which he declined.

On November 6, 2017, Warthen was hired by the Texas Rangers as the assistant pitching coach.

References

External links

, or Retrosheet, or Pura Pelota (Venezuelan Winter League), or New York Mets website (Biography)

   
   
   
   
   

1952 births
Living people
Águilas del Zulia players
Alexandria Dukes players
American expatriate baseball players in Canada
Baseball coaches from Nebraska
Baseball players from Nebraska
Buffalo Bisons (minor league) players
Denver Bears players
Detroit Tigers coaches
Detroit Tigers scouts
Houston Astros players
Jewish American baseball coaches
Jewish American baseball players
Jewish Major League Baseball players
Los Angeles Dodgers coaches
Major League Baseball bullpen coaches
Major League Baseball pitchers
Major League Baseball pitching coaches
Memphis Blues players
Minor league baseball coaches
Montreal Expos players
New York Mets coaches
Oklahoma City 89ers players
Philadelphia Phillies players
Pittsburgh Pirates coaches
Portland Beavers players
Québec Carnavals players
San Diego Padres coaches
Seattle Mariners coaches
Sportspeople from Omaha, Nebraska
Tiburones de La Guaira players
American expatriate baseball players in Venezuela
Watertown Expos players
Omaha North High School alumni
21st-century American Jews